The 1962 Macdonald Brier, the Canadian men's national curling championship, was held from March 5 to 10, 1962 at the Kitchener Memorial Auditorium in Kitchener, Ontario. A total of 37,013 fans attended the event.

Alberta, Manitoba, and Saskatchewan all finished round robin play with 8-2 records, necessitating a tiebreaker playoff between the three teams to determine the Brier championship. Team Saskatchewan, who was skipped by Ernie Richardson ended up capturing the Brier Tankard by beating defending champion Hec Gervais and their Alberta rink in the final 14-7. Alberta earlier advanced to the final with an 8-7 victory over Manitoba in the semifinal. This was only the third time in Brier history in which a three-way tiebreaker determined the championship with the other instances being in 1928 and 1946.

This was Saskatchewan's fourth Brier championship and the third Brier won in four years by the Richardson rink after winning back-to-back Briers in 1959 and 1960. Richardson's rink would go onto compete in the 1962 Scotch Cup in Scotland, which they also won for the third time in four years.

Event Summary
After the Thursday morning draw (Draw 7), there were seven teams all within a game of one another that had a shot at the championship. British Columbia, Ontario, and Saskatchewan were all sitting at 5-2 with Alberta, Manitoba, and Northern Ontario sitting at 4-2, and New Brunswick sitting at 4-3. With several of these teams having to play one another, it was appearing that this Brier would have one of the most exciting finishes of all time.

In the Thursday afternoon draw (Draw 8), Ontario defeated Northern Ontario 10-5, Alberta handed New Brunswick a 10-7 defeat, Saskatchewan beat winless Newfoundland 10-6, and Manitoba beat Quebec 9-6 while British Columbia draw a bye. Still after the Thursday afternoon draw, there were five teams with two losses while Northern Ontario and New Brunswick had three and four losses respectively.

The Thursday evening draw saw many blowouts along with a couple teams being eliminated. Manitoba demolished Prince Edward Island 15-2, Alberta easily defeated Quebec 14-5, and BC handing Ontario as costly 8-6 defeat. Northern Ontario was eliminated from contention as they were beat by Nova Scotia 10-7 and despite a 27-4 rout over Newfoundland, New Brunswick would be eliminated from Brier contention prior to the final day. With the final day of round robin play rising upon the curlers, there was a four-way tie for first place as Alberta, BC, Manitoba, and Saskatchewan were all 6-2 with Ontario sitting at 6-3 and having a bye on Friday morning. 

The Friday morning draw saw all four 6-2 teams win their games and improve to 7-2 heading into the final draw. With BC and Manitoba having to play in the Friday afternoon draw, this meant that Ontario was eliminated from contention. With the BC and Manitoba match looming, it was highly likely that there would be a three-way tiebreaker playoff but also a possibility of the BC/Manitoba winner winning the Brier if both Alberta and Saskatchewan both slipped up against Northern Ontario and Quebec respectively.

Alberta would make sure that there would be at least one tiebreaker game on Friday evening as they beat a reeling Northern Ontario team handily 14-9. Meanwhile Saskatchewan would make sure that the first three-way tiebreaker since 1946 would happen as they beat Quebec 10-8. The Manitoba and BC matchup went back-and-forth during the first half of play as the game was tied at 4 after six ends. However, Manitoba scored three in the seventh and two in the ninth (with BC scoring one in the eighth) to put the game out of reach and eventually win 10-7 joining both Alberta and Saskatchewan in the tiebreaker playoff. In the subsequent draw, Alberta would draw Manitoba in the semifinal on Friday evening while Saskatchewan drew a bye into the final on Saturday morning.

The semifinal game between Alberta and Manitoba on Friday evening proved to be as good as advertised. Alberta would hold the lead for the majority of the game including a 6-3 lead after the seventh end. But Ontario would mount a rally in the next four ends to tie the game at 7 heading into the final end. But Alberta would score one in the final end to win 8-7 and advance to the Saturday morning final against Saskatchewan.

The championship game on Saturday morning pitted two teams who had won the last three Brier Tankards with defending champion Hec Gervais of Alberta and two-time winner Ernie Richardson of Saskatchewan. Gervais was attempting to be the third skip in a row to win back-to-back Briers while Richardson was looking for his third Brier in the last four years. The championship proved to be a blowout as Saskatchewan dominated from the start with three in the first end. Alberta was not able to come back from the early deficit and would eventually trail 8-2 after the fifth end, which proved to be too much. Saskatchewan would roll to a 14-7 victory giving the Richardson rink not only their third Brier in four years, but also represent Canada in the upcoming 1962 Scotch Cup.

Teams
The teams are listed as follows:

Round-robin standings

Round-robin results
All draw times are listed in Eastern Time (UTC-05:00)

Draw 1
Monday, March 5 3:00 PM

Draw 2
Monday, March 5 8:00 PM

Draw 3
Tuesday, March 6 9:30 AM

Draw 4
Tuesday, March 6 3:00 PM

Draw 5
Wednesday, March 7 3:00 PM

Draw 6
Wednesday, March 7 8:00 PM

Draw 7
Thursday, March 8 9:30 AM

Draw 8
Thursday, March 8 3:00 PM

Draw 9
Thursday, March 8 8:00 PM

Draw 10
Friday, March 9 9:30 AM

Draw 11
Friday, March 9 3:00 PM

Playoff

Semifinal
Friday, March 9 8:00 PM

Final
Saturday, March 10 9:30 AM

References

External links 
 Video: 

Macdonald Brier, 1962
The Brier
Curling competitions in Ontario
Macdonald Brier
Macdonald Brier
Macdonald Brier
Sport in Kitchener, Ontario